The Missing is a 1999 Australian film about an Italian priest who visits Australia.

Cast
 Edgar Harris Jr. as Kurdaltcha Man
 Fabrizio Bentivoglio as Monsignor Tommaso
 Robert Forza  as Roccati
 Rosanna Ciavarella  as Baptism Mother
 Georgia Lenton 	 as Baptism Baby
 Rino Smarrini 	 as Father Pietro
 Fiorenzo Fiorentini as Cardinal Valetti
 Rebecca Frith 	 as Susan
 Emily Jade Barr 	 as Angela
 David Ngoombujarra 	 as Willie

References

External links

The Missing at Urban Cinefile
The Missing at Oz Movies

Australian crime thriller films
1999 films
Films scored by Bruce Smeaton
1990s English-language films
1990s Australian films